BoatTrader.com is a Miami, Florida-based website in the marine classified segment aimed at the US market launched in 1991.

History
 Print magazines launched in 1991 by Boat Trader with offices in over 40 cities across the United States.
 A website was launched in 1996 under the domain BoatTraderOnline.com, part of the TraderOnline.com network, which in turn was part of Trader Publishing Co.
 September 2004, NADAguides.com Integrates BoatTraderOnline.com as Exclusive Boat Classifieds Partner.
 In December 2005, SailBoatTraderOnline.com is launched by BoatTraderOnline.com.
 In 2009, BoatTrader shifted its entire audience from print to online under BoatTrader.com, merging 3 of the trader marine websites of BoatTraderOnline.com, SailBoatTraderOnline.com and YachtTraderOnline.com.
 June 2009, Yamaha and BoatTrader.com launch advertising program.
 May 2011, BoatTrader.com is merged with YachtWorld.com and boats.com brands under the new company Dominion Marine Media.
 June 1, 2017, Boat Trader and Boats Group decides Miami is the place to be, anchors headquarters.
 April 2022, Boat Trader launches the award-winning TV show Stomping Grounds on streaming television featuring local boaters and celebrities across America

References

External links

News
 "7 Reasons to Become a Full-Time Liveaboard. "Houseboat® Magazine". Dec 13, 2016.
 "Key Features to Look for in a Bass Fishing Boat. "Bass Angler Magazine". August 16, 2016.
 "8 Badass Bachelorette Ideas That You HAVEN'T Already Done. "POPSUGAR Inc.". April 30, 2016.
 "5 things that cost as much as the average U.S. wedding. The Washington Post. April 6, 2016.

Marine websites
Retail companies established in 1996
Internet properties established in 1996
Online retailers of the United States
Companies based in Norfolk, Virginia